Peyton McNamara (born 22 February 2002) is an American-born Jamaican footballer who plays as a midfielder for college team Ohio State Buckeyes and the Jamaica national team.

International career 
Born in the United States, McNamara is eligible to represent Jamaica internationally through her mother's heritage, and she first played for the U20 team in 2020.

McNamara received her first call-up to the senior team in June 2021. She then made her senior international debut against Nigeria on 10 June 2021.

References

External links 
 Ohio State profile
 

2002 births
Living people
Citizens of Jamaica through descent
Jamaican women's footballers
Jamaica women's international footballers
American women's soccer players
Ohio State Buckeyes women's soccer players
American sportspeople of Jamaican descent
African-American women's soccer players
21st-century African-American sportspeople
21st-century African-American women
Women's association football midfielders